Frank Mobley (21 November 1868 – 9 February 1956) was an English professional footballer who played as a centre forward. He played in the Football League for Small Heath and Bury.

For Small Heath, Mobley scored 64 goals in 103 appearances in all competitions, and was leading scorer in three successive seasons, from 1893–94when he was also overall top scorer in the Second Divisionto 1895–96. In a 1950 interview, he told the Sports Argus that he "could have got a few more if [he'd] been as selfish as some of the present-day forwards who seem to want to do all the scoring."

The 1939 Register lists Mobley as living in retirement with his son, also named Frank, and his family in the Five Ways district of Birmingham. Mobley died in Birmingham in 1956 at the age of 87.

Honours
Small Heath
 Second Division champions: 1892–93
 Second Division runners-up and promotion: 1893–94
 Second Division top scorer: 1893–94

Notes

References
General
 

Specific

1868 births
1956 deaths
Footballers from Birmingham, West Midlands
English footballers
Association football forwards
Coventry City F.C. players
Birmingham City F.C. players
Bury F.C. players
Gravesend United F.C. players
Football Alliance players
English Football League players
Southern Football League players